Alpine skiing at the 2011 Canada Winter Games was at Ski Wentworth in Truro, NS.  It was played the 20 to 25 February.  There were 10 events of Alpine Skiing.

Medal table
The following is the medal table for alpine skiing at the 2011 Canada Winter Games.

Men's events

Women's events

References

External links 
The Results

2011 Canada Winter Games